Pix is an instant payment platform created and managed by the monetary authority of Brazil, the Central Bank of Brazil (BCB), which enables the quick execution of payments and transfers. Pix was announced in the summer of 2019, and was fully operational on November 16, 2020. The "Pix" brand name and logo were created in-house by the Central Bank of Brazil in 2020.

History and usage
Brazil's central bank launched Pix in part to spur competition in the country's banking industry. Bloomberg referred to the app as "ubiquitous" in Brazil in October 2021, a year after Pix's release. As of November 2021, it has been reported that the system has already made more than 6 billion transactions totaling to an amount of 3.75 trillion BRL or about 682 billion USD.

Features 
The Brazilian instant payment ecosystem (Pix) was created with the aim of reducing cash transactions and offering an alternative to existing payment instruments, such as bank slip or boleto and ATM, as well as being faster and more affordable. The main advantages of Pix are its full-time availability, the speed of transactions using the system, low-cost functionality, convenience, versatility, open environment, and safety.

Ecosystem 
Pix is a structured ecosystem that allows carrying out financial payments and transfers instantly. The BCB is responsible for the management and operation of the Pix's operational frameworks: the instant payment System (SPI), which is the only infrastructure for instant payments settlement; as well as the "Transaction Accounts Identifier Directory" (DICT), the database linking Pix keys/aliases and the users' transactional account information.

Pix aliases and keys 
Pix allows instant payment between individuals and between individuals, companies, and government (P2P, P2B, B2B, P2G, and B2G). To perform an instant transfer or payment, the payer will need the receiver's Pix alias or key (the "nickname" used to identify the payee's/receiver's transactional account). For individuals, the keys/aliases can be personal data - such as their CPF number, e-mail address, cell phone number, random keys (a randomly generated UUID), and a QR code (static or dynamic). Companies can use their CNPJ number.

References 

Payment systems
Government of Brazil
Banking technology